The Shing Mun Tunnels are a system of tunnels and viaducts in the New Territories, Hong Kong connecting the new towns of Tsuen Wan to the west and Sha Tin to the east. They are a part of Route 9 and the Tsuen Wan entrance is the reset point (As Route 9 is apparently a loop) of Route 9.

Construction started on 11 February 1987 and the tunnels opened on 20 April 1990. They are made up of three sections, each with twin two-lane tunnels (one each way). The westerly pair passes through Smuggler's Ridge near Shing Mun Reservoir, where it gets its name from; the easterly pair passes through Needle Hill and is linked to the westerly pair by two viaducts over Lower Shing Mun Reservoir. The toll plaza and bus interchange are located outside the Tsuen Wan end of the tunnel.

The tunnels lead to Cheung Pei Shan Road and connect Wo Yi Hop Interchange in Tsuen Wan, and Shing Mun Tunnel Road in the east which links Tai Wai Road and ends at Tai Po Road.

The Shing Mun Tunnels are currently managed by Greater Lucky (H.K.) Company Limited.

History
The Shing Mun Tunnels were formally named as such on 19 May 1987, when the name was approved by the Sha Tin District Board. The tunnels were formally inaugurated by Governor David Wilson on 19 April 1990.

See also
Route 9
List of tunnels and bridges in Hong Kong
Shing Mun Tunnels Bus Interchange

References

External links

Toll tunnels in Hong Kong
Road tunnels in Hong Kong
Route 9 (Hong Kong)
Tsuen Wan District
Kwai Tsing District
Sha Tin District
Shing Mun
Tunnels completed in 1990
1990 establishments in Hong Kong
Extra areas operated by NT taxis